Dirk Coetzee (15 April 1945 – 7 March 2013) was co-founder and commander of the covert South African Security Police unit based at Vlakplaas. He and his colleagues were involved in a number of extra judicial killings including that of Griffiths Mxenge. Coetzee publicly revealed the existence of the Vlakplaas death squads in 1989, making himself a target of a failed assassination attempt.

Early life
Coetzee was born in April 1945 in Phokwane Local Municipality. His father was a postal worker. The younger Coetzee also worked for the postal service before becoming an investigator in 1969.

Career
Starting out as a constable in 1972, he rose through the ranks, and advanced his cause on secondment with the Rhodesian Armed Forces. He was promoted to captain in the security police and, in 1980, became the first commander of the secret police base on the Vlakplaas farm near Pretoria. In 1981, he was "assigned" to the murder of Griffiths Mxenge. His role as Vlakplaas commander ended after 18 months, following a disaster when two of his operatives were arrested on a sortie in Swaziland. He was replaced at Vlakplaas by Eugene de Kock, who was later convicted of attempting to assassinate Coetzee.

After Vlakplaas
He worked for a short time in both the narcotics and the flying squads. During this time, an internal disciplinary inquiry found him guilty of insubordination, obscene phone calls and distribution of a pornographic video. In 1986, he was found medically unfit to serve because of diabetes, and was discharged on a meagre pension.

Coetzee exposed the existence of the Vlakplaas unit in a 1989 interview with Vrye Weekblad, confirming a story that death-row convict Butana Almond Nofomela had told a Johannesburg weekly the previous year. After exposing the existence of the unit, he went on the run, staying in 38 houses in four countries – including a short while in London.  While there, he joined the African National Congress (ANC) and expressed his support for Nelson Mandela.

Return to South Africa
Coetzee was minded by the future president Jacob Zuma. He returned to South Africa in 1993. He was among the first to apply for amnesty with the Truth and Reconciliation Commission (TRC) when it was created and was granted amnesty on 4 August 1997. He later fell out of grace with the ANC.

Later life and death
Coetzee was employed by EduSolutions, which supplied textbooks on behalf of the government to Limpopo province. In July 2012, he told the media about huge piles of undelivered textbooks. Coetzee was suffering from kidney failure and cancer when he died on 7 March 2013, aged 67.

See also
 Wouter Basson
 Lothar Neethling

References

1945 births
2013 deaths
Afrikaner people
Apartheid in South Africa
Deaths from cancer in South Africa
Deaths from kidney failure
People from Phokwane Local Municipality
South African criminals
South African people of Dutch descent
South African police officers
People who testified at the Truth and Reconciliation Commission (South Africa)